The Finnish Institute of International Affairs (FIIA, UPI) is an independent research institute that produces topical information and research on international relations and the European Union. It also publishes the journal Ulkopolitiikka. It is located in Helsinki.

Organisation 

The institute has three different research programmes, which focus on the European Union, the EU's eastern neighbours and Russia, and global security. It also organises conferences, seminars, and round-table meetings on topical subjects related to the research programmes. These seminars provide a forum for high level discussions between academics and decision-makers. Research findings and current analyses of international topics are made public in publications called "FIIA-Report and Briefing Paper". In addition, the institute publishes Ulkopolitiikka, a quarterly journal on international relations. The institute also maintains the Archive and Chronology of Finnish Foreign Policy (Eilen Archive).

The staff of the institute consists of about 50 members. The director of the institute is Mika Aaltola. The work of the institute is directed by a nine-member board appointed by the Parliament. The institute also has an advisory council. The institute was established during the centennial session of the Finnish Parliament in June 2006 and started to function on 1 January 2007 under the auspices of the Parliament of Finland. Previously, the institute functioned as a private research organization that was founded by the Paasikivi Society in 1961 and maintained by the Foundation for Foreign Policy Research. Most of the institute's funding comes from the Parliament of Finland.

See also 
 Crisis Management Initiative
 European Centre of Excellence for Countering Hybrid Threats

References

External links
 
 Eilen (The Archive and Chronology of Finnish Foreign Policy)

Government of Finland
Foreign policy and strategy think tanks
Research institutes in Finland
Think tanks established in 1961
Think tanks based in Finland
Research institutes of international relations
Organizations established in 1961
1961 establishments in Finland